John Arundel Barnes M.A. D.Phil. DSC FBA (9 September 1918 – 13 September 2010) was an Australian and British social anthropologist. Until his death in 2010, Barnes held the post of Emeritus Professor of Sociology, Fellow of Churchill College.  From 1969 to 1982, he held the post of Professor of Sociology at the University of Cambridge. Previous positions include faculty posts in social anthropology at the University of Sydney and the Australian National University in Canberra, He also was associated with  Academy of the Social Sciences in Australia, University College London, St John's College, Cambridge, Balliol College, Oxford and the Rhodes-Livingstone Institute. Barnes was a student of Max Gluckman in the Manchester School.

Academic work

John A. Barnes, among others, is known to be the first to use the concept of social networks in a scientific context. This was in 1954, in the article "Class and Committees in a Norwegian Island Parish", in which he presented the result of nearly two years of fieldwork in Bremnes on Bømlo, Norway. His anthropological studies ranged from New Guinea to Norway. His interests and writings extended across the social and political sciences and beyond.

Publications

Known publication titles include:
The frequency of divorce (1964)
Three Styles in the Study of Kinship (1971)
Marriage in a Changing Society (1951)
Models and interpretations
Politics in a changing society: A political history of Fort Jameson Ngoni (1954)
The Ethics of Inquiry in Social Science: Three Lectures (1977)
Sociology in Cambridge (1970)
A Pack of Lies: Towards a Sociology of Lying (1994)
Who Should Know What? Social Science, Privacy, and Ethics (1979)
Kinship Studies: Some Impressions of the Current State of Play
Anthropology after Freud
Social Networks (1972)
Inquest on the Murngin (1967) (Royal Anthropological Institute. Occasional papers, no.26)
African models in the New Guinea Highlands (1962)
Humping on my drum (autobiography)

References

External links
 Interviewed by Jack Goody 19 December 1983 (video)
 Obituary Notice, Cambridge University Reporter No 6197, Wednesday 6 October 2010, Vol cxli No 1.]
 Article about John Arundel Barnes in Framtida.no. (in Norwegian Nynorsk)
 French translation of the article Class and committee in a Norvegian Island Parish, in Cairn; introduction about Barnes (in French)

1918 births
2010 deaths
Australian anthropologists
British anthropologists
Social anthropologists
Fellows of Churchill College, Cambridge
Academic staff of the University of Sydney
Academic staff of the Australian National University
Alumni of the University of Manchester
Fellows of the British Academy
People associated with the Rhodes-Livingstone Institute
Australian emigrants to the United Kingdom